Sowjet (Soviet in German) was a German monthly communist publication, edited by Paul Levi, printed in Berlin. The first issue was published on 1 July 1919. Following Levi's expulsion from the Communist Party of Germany, the journal, from 1 July 1921, changed its orientation and was henceforth published under the name of Unser Weg. By the end of 1922 it ceased publication.

Among its contributors were Henriette Roland-Holst, Paul Frölich, Adolf Maslow, Fritz Geyer, and others.

References

1919 establishments in Germany
1922 disestablishments in Germany
Communist magazines
Defunct political magazines published in Germany
German-language magazines
Magazines established in 1919
Magazines disestablished in 1922
Magazines published in Berlin
Monthly magazines published in Germany